Sheikh Mohammed bin Abdulrahman bin Jassim Al Thani (born 1 November 1980) is a Qatari diplomat, economist, and politician who has served as the Prime Minister of Qatar since 7 March 2023. He previously served as the country's Deputy Prime Minister between 2017 and 2023, and its Minister of Foreign Affairs between 2016 and 2023. 

In his current capacity as Foreign Minister, Sheikh Mohammed's responsibilities include planning and implementing Qatar's foreign policy, maintaining and extending the country's strategic bilateral/multilateral relations, leading mediation efforts, and consolidating international peace and security by encouraging the peaceful settlement of international disputes. 

Sheikh Mohammed also serves as Chairman of Qatar Fund for Development, since 2014, Chairman of Qatar Investment Authority, since 2018, and is a member of Qatar's Supreme Council for Economic Affairs and Investments.

Early life and education

Sheikh Mohammed was born and raised in Doha, Qatar. He is part of the Qatari royal family as a member of the House of Thani. He has a bachelor's degree in economics and business administration from Qatar University (2003).

Career

Sheikh Mohammed joined the Ministry of Foreign Affairs in 2013 as Assistant Foreign Minister for International Cooperation Affairs.  

Prior to joining the ministry, Sheikh Mohammed served as economic researcher and then later Director of Economic Affairs at the Supreme Council of Family Affairs from 2005 to 2009. 

He later became the director of the Department of Public and Private Sectors Partnership at the Ministry of Business and Trade in 2009 and launched “Enterprise Qatar” – an organization that provides technical and financial support for small and medium-sized enterprises.

A year later, in 2010, Sheikh Mohammed served as Secretary of the Personal Representative of His Highness the Emir Sheikh Hamad bin Khalifa Al Thani for follow-up affairs at the Amiri Diwan in 2010. 

Between 2011 and 2012, Sheikh Mohammed attained the rank of undersecretary and became the Chairman of the Executive Committee of the Development of Small and Medium-sized Enterprises and Chairman of the Board of Directors of Aspire – Katara Investment Company.

Role as foreign minister

In his current capacity, Sheikh Mohammed’s responsibilities as Minister of Foreign Affairs include planning and implementing Qatar’s foreign policy, maintaining and extending the country’s strategic bilateral/multilateral relations, leading mediation efforts, and consolidating international peace and security by encouraging the peaceful settlement of international disputes.

Premiership 
On 7 March 2023, in a cabinet reshuffle, he was appointed as the Prime Minister of Qatar.

Role as chairman of QIA

In Sheikh Mohammed’s capacity as chairman of QIA, he provides leadership to the QIA Board of Directors and ensures QIA’s sound governance framework through accountability and sound decision-making.

Under the Chairman’s leadership, the Board of Directors implements QIA’s mission of safeguarding the well-being of future generations through long-term responsible investment while supporting the diversification of Qatar’s economy, and overseeing the embedding of the values of integrity, respect, and responsibility in QIA’s culture.

Role as chairman of QFFD

As chairman of QFFD, Sheikh Mohammed directs the fund's operations and the expansion of its activities to reach more than 70 countries around the world, notably in the Middle East, Asia, and Africa.

Sheikh Mohammed contributes to implementing international development through the fund’s long-term strategy focusing on education, health, economic empowerment, and climate change. This strategy is based on Qatar Vision 2030 and is consistent with the UN Sustainable Development Goals (UNSDGs).

Sheikh Mohammed has sponsored the launch of several humanitarian and development initiatives through the Fund, including, but not limited to, the “Qatar Creates Vision” initiative in India and Bangladesh, the “Quest” initiative for educating displaced Syrians and refugees in both Syria and neighboring countries, and the "Business Incubator Laboratories" initiative in cooperation with the United Nations Development Program. 

Sheikh Mohammed’s leadership has contributed to strengthening ties with recipient countries and Qatar’s prominent efforts overall to coordinate international multilateral action.

See also
List of foreign ministers in 2016
List of foreign ministers in 2017
List of current foreign ministers

References
 "The Crisis in the Gulf: Qatar Responds" , 5 July 2017

External links

 "The Crisis in the Gulf: Qatar Responds" , 5 July 2017

 

1980 births
Qatar University alumni
Prime Ministers of Qatar
Foreign ministers of Qatar
Living people
Qatari economists
Mohammed bin Abdulrahman bin Jassim